The Caucasian War or Caucasus War was a 19th century military conflict between the Russian Empire and various peoples of the North Caucasus who resisted subjugation during the Russian conquest of the Caucasus. It consisted of a series of military actions waged by the Russian Imperial Army and Cossack settlers against the native inhabitants such as the Adyghe, Abaza–Abkhaz, Ubykhs, Chechens, and Dagestanis as the Tsars sought to expand. 

Russian control of the Georgian Military Road in the center divided the Caucasian War into the Russo-Circassian War in the west and the conquest of Chechnya and Dagestan in the east. Other territories of the Caucasus (comprising contemporary eastern Georgia, southern Dagestan, Armenia and Azerbaijan) were incorporated into the Russian Empire at various times in the 19th century as a result of Russian wars with Persia. The remaining part, western Georgia, was taken by the Russians from the Ottomans during the same period.

History 
The war took place during the administrations of three successive Russian Tsars: Alexander I (reigned 1801–1825), Nicholas I (1825–1855), and Alexander II (1855–1881). The leading Russian commanders included Aleksey Petrovich Yermolov in 1816–1827, Mikhail Semyonovich Vorontsov in 1844–1853, and Aleksandr Baryatinskiy in 1853–1856. The famous Russian writer Leo Tolstoy, who gained much of his knowledge and experience of war for his book War and Peace from these encounters, took part in the hostilities. The Russian poet Alexander Pushkin referred to the war in his Byronic poem "The Prisoner of the Caucasus", written in 1821. Mikhail Lermontov, often referred to as "the poet of the Caucasus", participated in the battle near the river Valerik which inspired him to write the poem of the same name of the river dedicated to this event. In general, the Russian armies that served in the Caucasian wars were very eclectic; as well as ethnic Russians from various parts of the Russian empire they included Cossacks, Armenians, Georgians, Caucasus Greeks, Ossetians, and even soldiers of Muslim background like Tatars, Bashkirs, Kazakhs, Uyghurs, Turkmen and even some Caucasian Muslim tribes who sided with the Russians against fellow Muslims of Caucasus. Muslim soldiers of Imperial Russian Army had played some parts on religious discussion and wooing allies for Russia against their fellow Muslim brethren in the Caucasus.

The Russian invasion encountered fierce resistance. The first period of the invasion ended coincidentally with the death of Alexander I and the Decembrist Revolt in 1825. It achieved surprisingly little success, especially compared with the then recent Russian victory over the "Grande Armée" of Napoleon in 1812.

Between 1825 and 1833, little military activity took place in the Caucasus against the native North Caucasians as wars with Turkey (1828/1829) and with Persia (1826–1828) occupied the Russians. After considerable successes in both wars, Russia resumed fighting in the Caucasus against the various rebelling native ethnic groups in the North Caucasus, and that was the start of the Caucasian genocide committed by Russians, most of the terminated people were from the Circassian nation.
Russian units again met resistance, notably led by Ghazi Mollah, Gamzat-bek, and Hadji Murad. Imam Shamil followed them. He led the mountaineers from 1834 until his capture by Dmitry Milyutin in 1859. In 1843, Shamil launched a sweeping offensive aimed at the Russian outposts in Avaria. On 28 August 1843, 10,000 men converged, from three different directions, on a Russian column in Untsukul, killing 486 men. In the next four weeks, Shamil captured every Russian outpost in Avaria except one, exacting over 2,000 casualties on the Russian defenders. He feigned an invasion north to capture a key chokepoint at the convergence of the Avar and Kazi-Kumukh rivers. In 1845, Shamil's forces achieved their most dramatic success when they withstood a major Russian offensive led by Prince Vorontsov.

During the Crimean War of 1853–1856, the Russians brokered a truce with Shamil, but hostilities resumed in 1855. Warfare in the Caucasus finally ended between 1856 and 1859, when a 250,000 strong army under General Baryatinsky broke the mountaineers' resistance.

The war in the Eastern part of the North Caucasus ended in 1859; the Russians captured Shamil, forced him to surrender, to swear allegiance to the Tsar, and then exiled him to Central Russia. However, the war in the Western part of the North Caucasus resumed with the Circassians (i.e. Adyghe, but the term is often used to include their Abkhaz–Abaza kin as well) resuming the fight. A manifesto of Tsar Alexander II declared hostilities at an end on June 2 (May 21 OS), 1864. Among post-war events, a tragic page in the history of the indigenous peoples of the North Caucasus (especially the Circassians), was Muhajirism, or population transfer of the Muslim population to the Ottoman Empire.

Aftermath

Many Circassians were forced to emigrate and leave their home to the Ottoman Empire, and to a lesser degree Persia. The genocide of Terek Cossacks during the Civil war was a continuation of the genocide of Circassians, former allies of the Russian Empire who supported the Communists. Most of the historical Circassian territories were historically distributed amongst the allies of the Russian Empire, such as certain Vainakh and Turkic families. However, many of those new settlers were exiled by Stalin in 1944, and some of those lands was redistributed, this time, to Georgians and Ossetians. Though many of the exiled people have returned, many lands, granted to them by the Russian empire, are still inhabited by Ossetians. The Georgians left all the lands given to them as they did not consider it theirs since the land was not within Georgia itself, but in neighbouring Russia. This still generates tensions (East Prigorodny Conflict) in the former war theaters of the Caucasian war. Today, there are three titular Circassian republics in Russia: Adygea, Kabardino-Balkaria, and Karachayevo-Cherkessia. Other historical Circassian territories such as Krasnodar Krai, Stavropol Krai, and southwestern Rostov Oblast have much smaller communities of Circassians. The diaspora in Syria is repatriating to Russia. Circassians from Kosovo also returned to Russia after the civil war in Kosovo.

According to one source, the population in Greater and Lesser Kabarda decreased from 350,000, before the war, to 50,000 by 1818. According to another version, in 1790 the population was 200,000 people and in 1830 30,000 people. As a percentage of the total population of the North Caucasus, the number of the remaining Circassians was 40% (1795), 30% (1835) and 25% (1858). Similarly: Chechens 9%, 10% and 8.5%; Avars 11%, 7% and 2%; Dargins 9.5%, 7.3% and 5.8%; Lezghins 4.4%, 3.6% and 3.9% .

Gallery

See also
 Russian conquest of Chechnya and Dagestan
 Russo-Circassian War
 Chechen-Kazikumukh war

References

Further reading

 Pokrovsky N. I. Caucasian Wars and the Imamate of Shamil / Foreword. N. N. Pokrovsky, introduction. and approx. V. G. Gadzhiev. — M.: ROSSPEN, 2000. — 511 p. — .
 Bell, J.S Journal of a residence in Circassia during the years 1837, 1838, and 1839 (English)
 Dubrovin, N.  История войны и владычества русских на Кавказе, volumes 4–6. SPb, 1886–88.
 Kaziev, Shapi. Imam Shamil, Molodaya Gvardiya publishers: Moscow, 2001, 2003, 2006, 2010
 Kaziev, Shapi. Akhoulgo. Caucasian War of 19th century. 
 The historical novel Epoch Publishing house. Makhachkala, 2008. 
 Gammer, Moshe. Muslim Resistance to the Tsar: Shamil and the Conquest of Chechnia and Daghestan. Frank Cass & Co. Ltd., 1994. 247 p.  —  .

 
Caucasus Viceroyalty (1801–1917)
History of the North Caucasus
19th-century conflicts
19th-century military history of the Russian Empire
19th century in Georgia (country)
Military history of Georgia (country)
Wars involving Chechnya
Wars involving the Circassians
Wars involving Ingushetia
Wars involving the Russian Empire
Jihad